Ante Palaversa (born 6 April 2000) is a Croatian professional footballer who plays as a midfielder for  club Troyes.

Club career

Hajduk Split
Born in Split, Croatia, Palaversa started his youth career with the Hajduk Split academy. At the end of the 2016–17 season, he won the Best Player of the Youth League award and was subsequently promoted to the reserve team. After playing regularly for the reserve team in the second tier, he was promoted to the senior team in June 2018 by manager Željko Kopić.
On 26 July 2018, Palaversa made his first team debut, coming on as a substitute in a 1–0 victory over Bulgarian club Slavia Sofia in a UEFA Europa League qualifying match. On 26 August, he scored his first goal for the club in a 2–2 draw against Inter Zaprešić, scoring a volley from 21-metres.

Manchester City
On 28 January 2019, it was announced that Palaversa would be joining Manchester City for an eventual fee of €7 million, instantly returning to Hajduk on loan. He completed the move on 31 January.

Loan to Getafe
On 31 August 2020, Palaversa joined Getafe on loan.

Loan to KV Kortrijk 
On 26 January 2021, Palaversa moved to Belgian club KV Kortrijk on loan until the end of the season.

Troyes
On 31 August 2022, Palaversa joined Troyes, another club within the City Football Group, on a three-year contract.

Career statistics

References

External links
 
 HNK Hajduk Split profile
 

2000 births
Living people
Footballers from Split, Croatia
Association football midfielders
Croatian footballers
Croatia youth international footballers
Croatia under-21 international footballers
HNK Hajduk Split II players
HNK Hajduk Split players
Manchester City F.C. players
K.V. Oostende players
Getafe CF footballers
K.V. Kortrijk players
ES Troyes AC players
First Football League (Croatia) players
Croatian Football League players
Belgian Pro League players
La Liga players
Ligue 1 players
Croatian expatriate footballers
Expatriate footballers in England
Croatian expatriate sportspeople in England
Expatriate footballers in Belgium
Croatian expatriate sportspeople in Belgium
Expatriate footballers in Spain
Croatian expatriate sportspeople in Spain
Expatriate footballers in France
Croatian expatriate sportspeople in France